The Dominique River is a river in the Côte-Nord region of Quebec, Canada. It empties into the Gulf of Saint Lawrence.

Location

It has one important tributary, the Foins River (Hay River), which drains the southeast of the basin.
The mouth of the river is in the municipality of Port-Cartier in the Sept-Rivières Regional County Municipality.
At its mouth in the city of Port-Cartier the river converges with an arm of the Aux Rochers River in the Rivière-aux-Rochers Park.
A trail in the park leads to the Rivière Dominique waterfall.

The origin of the name, which was made official on 5 December 1968, is not known.

Basin

It lies between the basins of the Aux Rochers River to the west and the Sainte-Marguerite River to the east.
The river basin is in the Sept-Rivières  Regional County Municipality, divided between the unorganized territory of Lac-Walker (65.8%) and the town of Port-Cartier (34.2%).
Part of the river basin is in the Port-Cartier–Sept-Îles Wildlife Reserve (Réserve faunique Port-Cartier–Sept-Îles).
Part is in the proposed Lake Pasteur Biodiversity Reserve.

Terrain

The bedrock is dominated by magmatic rocks, deformed to some extent, of migmatite, granitoid rocks and granitic gneiss.
The plateau and piedmont area include vast areas where the bedrock is exposed.
In the coastal plain the Goldthwait Sea deposited large amounts of clay and silt sediment as it followed the retreat of the glaciers after the last ice age. 
As the land rebounded from the weight of the ice, the sea retreated and the marine sediments were covered by coarser sandy estuarine and deltaic sediments.

Hydrology

Waterbodies cover 5.72% of the Dominique River basin.
Ombrotrophic peatlands cover 6.15% of the basin, mostly on the coastal plain where the flat relief and fine sediments retain the water.
The rivers and streams follow angular courses dictated by fractures in the hard bedrock.
Upstream the rivers follow rather rectilinear courses through narrow valleys, but downstream they meander slightly through the loose deposits of the coastal plain.

Environment

A map of the ecological regions of Quebec shows the upper and central Dominique River in sub-regions 6j-T and 6m-T of the east spruce/moss subdomain, and the lower part in sub-region 5g-T of the eastern fir/white birch subdomain..
On the coastal plain the forest cover is dominated by stands of balsam fir (Abies balsamea), white spruce (Picea glauca) and paper birch (Betula papyrifera), with lesser numbers of jack pine (Pinus banksiana), larch and trembling aspen (Populus tremuloides).
Further inland in the spruce-moss region  the forest cover is dominated by black spruce (Picea mariana), with balsam fir and, to a lesser extent, hardwoods such as paper birch, trembling aspen and balsam poplar (Populus balsamifera). 
Fish species are American eel (Anguilla rostrata) and brook trout (Salvelinus fontinalis).
There are rainbow smelt (Osmerus mordax) at the mouth of the river. 
The Dominique River is not recognized as an Atlantic salmon river.

Conservation

The watershed is almost entirely contained in the Port-Cartier–Sept-Îles Wildlife Reserve. 
The proposed Lake Pasteur Biodiversity Reserve extends into the west of the watershed. 
It is a protected area under IUCN category III, established in 2003.
On the Gulf of St. Lawrence the river basin adjoins the Port-Cartier West Waterfowl Concentration Area (IUCN category VI).

Notes

Sources

Rivers of Côte-Nord